Beowülf is the debut album by the band of the same name, released in 1986.

Like many Beowülf albums, the recording is out of print. In 2004, the album was re-released as the first half of the Re-Releases compilation, along with its follow-up Lost My Head... But I'm Back on the Right Track.

Track listing
 "Took the Jewel" (2:35)
 "No Doubt" (2:47)
 "Drink, Fight, Fuck" (1:48)
 "All I Need" (2:41)
 "Shoot Them Down" (2:15)
 "Taste the Steel (Extended Fight Version)" (4:02)
 "Phuck" (3:16)
 "Get the Grind" (3:17)
 "Americanizm" (1:51)
 "Down 'Til Dead" (3:07)
 "Belligerence" (1:27)
 "Don't Give a Damn" (3:16)
 "(My Life) Alcohol" (3:03)

Credits
 Dale Henderson - vocals and guitar
 Mike Jensen - guitar
 Paul Yamada - bass
 Michael Alvarado - drums

References

Beowülf albums
1986 debut albums